Jean-Baptiste Surian (20 September 1670, Saint-Chamas – 3 August 1754) was a French Oratorian and preacher who became bishop of Vence. He was elected to the Académie française in 1733.

History/Life Events

Sources
http://www.catholic-hierarchy.org/bishop/bsurian.html

External links 
Biography—Academie francaise

1670 births
1754 deaths
People from Bouches-du-Rhône
Bishops of Vence
Members of the Académie Française
Oratorians